The Samsung NX 50-200mm F4-5.6 OIS is an interchangeable camera lens announced by Samsung on January 4, 2010.

References
http://www.dpreview.com/products/samsung/lenses/samsung_50-200_4-5p6_ois/specifications

050-200mm F4-5.6 OIS
Camera lenses introduced in 2010